Van herbed cheese is a type of cheese made out of sheep's or cow's milk. Ripened cheese varieties containing herbs are traditional in Turkey and have been manufactured for more than 200 years in the east and southeast of the country. They are manufactured from raw milk, semi-hard in texture and salty in taste and have the aroma of garlic or thyme due to added herbs. Twenty-five types of herb, including Allium,  Thymus, Silene and Ferula species which are most popular, are used individually or as appropriate mixtures. The most popular of these cheeses is Otlu which is produced mainly in the Van Province of Turkey in small dairies and villages, but now is produced in other cities of the eastern region of Turkey and its popularity increases continuously throughout Turkey.

Herbs used
 Ranunculus polyanthemos L.(Ranunculaceae)
 Nasturtium officinale R. Br. (Brassicaceae)
 Gypsophila L. spp. (Caryophyllaceae)
 Silene vulgaris (Maench) Garcke var. vulgaris (Caryophyllaceae)
 Anthriscus nemorosa (Bieb.) Sprengel (Apiaceae)
 Carum carvi L. (Apiaceae)
 Anethum graveolens L. (Apiaceae)
 Prangos pabularia Lindl. (Apiaceae)
 Prangos ferulacea (L.) Lind. (Apiaceae)
 Ferula L. sp. (Apiaceae)
 Ferula orientalis L. (Apiaceae)
 Ferula rigidula DC. (Apiaceae)
 Thymus kotschyanus Boiss. et Hohen. var. glabrescens Boiss. (Lamiaceae)
 Thymus migricus Klokov et Des. – Shoct. (Lamiaceae)
 Mentha spicata L. subsp. spicata (Lamiaceae)
 Ziziphora clinopodioides Lam. (Lamiaceae)
 Ocimum basilicum L. (Lamiaceae)
 Eremurus spectabilis Bieb. (Liliaceae)
 Allium schoenoprasum L. (Liliaceae)
 Allium fuscoviolaceum Fomin (Liliaceae)
 Allium scorodoprasum L.subsp. rotundum(L.)Stearn (Liliaceae)
 Allium aucheri Boiss. (Liliaceae)
 Allium paniculatum L. subsp. paniculatum (Liliaceae)
 Allium akaka S. G. Gmelin (Liliaceae)
 Allium cf. cardiostemon Fisch. et Mey. (Liliaceae)

See also
 List of cheeses

Sheep's-milk cheeses
Goat's-milk cheeses
Cow's-milk cheeses
Turkish cheeses